A special election for Missouri's 8th congressional district was held on June 4, 2013, following the resignation of Jo Ann Emerson on January 22, 2013, to head the National Rural Electric Cooperative Association. The Republican and Democratic parties selected their own nominees without a primary.

The deadline to request an absentee ballot for the special election was May 29, 2013. A televised candidate's forum took place on May 27, 2013, at Southeast Missouri State University-River Campus; all party candidates participated while the write-in candidate did not attend. In the general election on June 4, 2013, Republican Jason Smith received 67.1% of the vote, beating Democrat Steve Hodges (27.4%), Constitutional Doug Enyart (3.6%), and Libertarian Bill Slantz (1.5%).

Candidates

Republican Party
 Jason Smith, Speaker Pro Tem of the Missouri House of Representatives

Declared/Not Selected
 Wendell Bailey, former State Treasurer of Missouri and U.S. Representative
 Dan W. Brown, State Senator
 Jason Crowell, former state senator
 Kevin P. Engler, state representative, former state senator, former mayor of Farmington
 Peter Kinder, Lieutenant Governor of Missouri
 Scott Lipke, former state representative
 Bob Parker, local resident and landowner
 Todd Richardson, State Representative
 Lloyd Smith, State Republican Party executive director
 Pedro Sotelo, businessman
 Sarah Steelman, former state treasurer of Missouri
 Clint Tracy, state representative and United States Navy Lieutenant commander
 John Tyrrell, attorney
 Wayne Wallingford, state senator, United States Air Force Lieutenant Colonel and Silver Star recipient

Declined
 John Jordan, Cape Girardeau County Sheriff

Democratic Party

 Steve Hodges, State Representative District 149

Declared/Not Selected
 Todd Mahn, businessman
 Linda Black, state representative
 Jack Rushin, chiropractor and Democratic nominee for the seat in 2012
 Terry Swinger, former state representative

Declined
 Russ Carnahan, former U.S. Representative

Libertarian Party
 Bill Slantz, businessman

Declared/Not Selected
 Jason Williams (withdrew before party meeting)

Constitution Party
 Doug Enyart, U.S. Marine and professional forester

Independent/Other
 Dr. Robert George (write-in candidate)
 Thomas Brown (write-in candidate)
 Wayne L. Byington (write-in candidate)
 Theo (Ted) Brown, Sr. (write-in candidate)

General election

Results

See also
 List of special elections to the United States House of Representatives
 Missouri's 8th congressional district
 2012 House of Representatives election in Missouri 8th district

References

External links
 Bill Slantz campaign website
 Jason Smith campaign website
 Steve Hodges campaign website 
 Doug Enyart campaign website

United States House of Representatives 08
Missouri 08
2013 08 special
Missouri 2013 08
Missouri 08
United States House of Representatives 2013 08